Sayedna Iftekhar Ahmed Sharif (22 February 1924 – 4 March 1995), often mononymously credited as Iftekhar, was an Indian actor who mainly worked in Hindi cinema. He is known for his role as a police officer.

Career
Iftekhar was born in Jalandhar and was the eldest among four brothers and a sister. After completing his matriculation, Iftekhar did a diploma course in painting from Lucknow College Of Arts. Iftekhar had a passion for singing and was impressed with the famous singer Kundanlal Sehgal. In his 20s, Iftekhar travelled to Calcutta for an audition conducted by the music composer Kamal Dasgupta, who was then serving for HMV. Dasgupta was so impressed by Iftekhar's personality that he recommended his name to M. P. Productions as an actor.

Iftekhar made his debut in the 1944 film Taqraar, which was made under the banner of Art Films-Kolkata.

Many of Iftekhar's close relatives, including his parents and siblings, migrated to Pakistan during the partition. He would have preferred to stay in India, but rioting forced him to leave Calcutta. Along with his wife and daughters, he moved to Bombay, where they struggled to make ends meet. Iftekhar had been introduced to actor Ashok Kumar during his time in Calcutta and contacted him in Bombay, gaining a role in the Bombay Talkies movie Muqaddar (1950). Iftekhar acted in over 400 films in a career that spanned from the 1940s through to the early 1990s.
His brother, Imtiaz Ahmed, was a famous TV character actor of PTV, especially Afshan and Tanhaiyan .
Like many of the older character actors who populated the Bollywood universe of the 1960s and 1970s, Iftekhar had been a lead actor in his youth during the "golden age" of Bollywood, in the 1940s and 1950s. His roles ranged from father, uncle, great-uncle, grandfather, police officer, police commissioner, courtroom judge and doctor. He also did negative roles in Bandini, Sawan Bhadon, Khel Khel Mein and Agent Vinod.

In the 1960s and 1970s, Iftekhar graduated to playing uncle, father, and what came to be his speciality: police inspector roles, doctor or senior advocate. Generally he played "sympathetic" characters but, on occasion, he played the heavy. One of his most memorable roles as a heavy was as Amitabh Bachchan's corrupt industrialist mentor in Yash Chopra's classic Deewaar (1975). Another of Iftekhar's classic roles was as the police inspector in Prakash Mehra's Zanjeer. It was a small part, but the scene where Iftekhar reprimands the near-hysteric Amitabh Bachchan for taking the law into his own hands is incredibly powerful. Another important role as a police officer was played by him in the 1978 hit film Don. Some of his major roles came in Rajesh Khanna films such as Joroo Ka Ghulam, Mehboob Ki Mehndi, The Train , Khamoshi, Safar, Raja Rani, Ittefaq, Rajput and Awam.

Besides Deewaar and Zanjeer, Iftekar had character roles in many of the classics of 1960s, 1970s, 1980s Bollywood cinema: Bimal Roy's Bandini, Raj Kapoor's Sangam, Manoj Kumar's Shaheed, Teesri Manzil, Teesri Kasam, Johny Mera Naam, Hare Rama Hare Krishna, Don, The Gambler (1971 film), Ankhiyon Ke Jharokhon Se (1978) and Sholay, to name but a few.

Apart from Hindi films, he appeared in two episodes of the American TV series Maya in 1967 as well the English language films Bombay Talkie (1970) and City of Joy (1992).

Personal life
Iftekhar married Hannah Joseph, a Jewish lady from Calcutta, who changed her religion and name to Rehana Ahmed. They had two daughters; Salma and Sayeda. Daughter Sayeda died of cancer on 7 February 1995.

Selected filmography

 Qazzak Ki Ladki (1937)
 Fashionable Wife (1938)
 Taqrar (1944)
 Rajlaxmi (1945)
 Ghar (1945)
 Patanga (1949) - 'Mali' / Gardener
 Muqaddar (1950)
 Lajawab (1950)
 Sagai (1951) - Chandni's Father
 Saqi (1952)
 Ashiana (1952) - Jeevan
 Ek Do Teen (1953)
 Aabshar (1953)
 Mirza Ghalib (1954) - Badsha
 Biraj Bahu (1954) - Kishorilal, Deodhar's Assistant
 Naukari (1954)
 Shree 420 (1955) - Police Inspector
 Devdas (1955) - Bhijudas
 Society (1955)
 Flying Man (1955)
 Taksaal (1956)
 Samundari Daku (1956)
 Jagte Raho (1956) - Chandu (Leader)
 Ab Dilli Dur Nahin (1957) - Police Inspector
 Sitaron Se Aage (1958) - Mohan
 Ragini (1958) - Villager
 Night Club (1958)
 Dilli Ka Thug (1958) - Inspector Dilip Singh
 Fashionable Wife (1959) - Girdhari
 Raat Ke Rahi (1959) - Watson
 Naach Ghar (1959)
 Mr. John (1959)
 Kangan (1959) - Ramesh Bhatia
 Bedard Zamana Kya Jane (1959) - Public Prosecutor
 Kalpana (1960) - Johar
 Chhabili (1960)
 Aanchal (1960) - Mohan
 Modern Girl (1961) - Medicine Dealer
 Zamana Badal Gaya (1961)
 Roop Ki Rani Choron Ka Raja (1961) - Fellow Traveller (uncredited)
 Kismet Palat Ke Dekh (1961)
 Kanch Ki Gudiya (1961) - Mr. Ghosh
 Dark Street (1961)
 Professor (1962) - Artist
 Soorat Aur Seerat (1962)
 Rangoli (1962) - Police Inspector
 Pathan (1962)
 Gharni Shobha (1963)
 Bandini (1963) - Chutti Babu
 Yeh Rastey Hain Pyar Ke (1963) - Ashok Kumar's Junior Lawyer
 Meri Surat Teri Ankhen (1963) - Prakash
 Grahasti (1963) - Harish's Brother-In-Law
 Awara Badal (1964) - Darshan Singh
 Sangam (1964) - Indian Air Force Officer
 Cha Cha Cha (1964) - Family doctor
 Shehnai (1964)
 Door Gagan Ki Chhaon Mein (1964) - Jagga
 Apne Huye Paraye (1964) - Public Prosecutor
 Shaheed (1965) - Public Prosecutor – Lahore
 Guide (1965) - Inspector
 Ajnabi (1966)
 Phool Aur Patthar (1966) - Babu (as Iftikhar)
 Teesri Manzil (1966) - Police Inspector
 Teesri Kasam (1966) - Zamindar Vikram Singh
 Sagaai (1966) - Hospital doctor
 Pinjre Ke Panchhi (1966) - Police Inspector
 Hamraaz (1967) - Advocate Jagmohan Kumar
 Maya (1967, TV Series) - Jank Bahadur
 Duniya Nachegi (1967) - Jagdish 
 Sunghursh (1968) - Shankar B. Prasad
 Do Dooni Char (1968) - Police Inspector Bukhari
 Aadmi Aur Insaan (1969) - Saxena
 Ittefaq (1969) - Inspector Karwe
 Sajan (1969) - Police Inspector
 Rahgir (1969)
 Pyar Ka Mausam (1969) - Keshav
 Intaquam (1969) - Police Inspector
 Sau Saal Beet Gaye (1970) - Indrajeet Singh
 Prem Pujari (1970) - Indian Army Officer
 The Train (1970) - Police Commissioner
 Sawan Bhadon (1970) - Gauri Shankar
 Tum Haseen Main Jawaan (1970) - Raja Sahab (Anuradha's Father)
 My Love (1970) - Doctor
 Johny Mera Naam (1970) - Chief Inspector Mehta
 Bombay Talkie (1970) - Vizarat Khan
 The Evil Within (1970) - Hannif
 Safar (1970) - Prosecuting Lawyer
 Khamoshi (1970) - Doctor
 Insaan Aur Shaitan (1970) - Barna
 Bhai-Bhai (1970) - Police Inspector
 Irada (1971) - Police Inspector
 Do Raha (1971) - Thakur / Geeta's Father
 Mehboob Ki Mehndi (1971) - Nawab Safdarjung
 Elaan (1971) - Police Chief
 Kal Aaj Aur Kal (1971) - Ram's Friend
 Hare Rama Hare Krishna (1971) - IGP
 Sharmeelee (1971) - Colonel
 Jal Bin Machhli Nritya Bin Bijli (1971) - Dr. Verma
 Gambler (1971)
 Door Ka Raahi (1972) - Uncle John
 Kundan (1972)
 Dastaan (1972) - Prosecuting Lawyer
 Apradh (1972) - Police Inspector
 Jawani Diwani (1972) - Thakur
 Joroo Ka Ghulam (1972) - Kalpana's uncle
 Zindagi Zindagi (1972) - Ismail
 Yeh Gulistan Hamara (1972) - Vijay's Captain
 Tanhai (1972) - Barrister Madanlal Kapoor
 Rani Mera Naam (1972)
 Pyaar Diwana (1972)
 Parchhaiyan (1972) - Choudhary Shyamlal
 Ek Bar Mooskura Do (1972)
 Bees Saal Pehle (1972) - Laxman
 Sonal (1973)
 Raja Rani (1973) - Suresh's Father
 Loafer (1973) - Police Commissioner
 Daag: A Poem of Love (1973) - Inspector Singh
 Zanjeer (1973) - Police Commissioner Singh
 Jheel Ke Us Paar (1973) - Diwanji
 Joshila (1973)
 Nirdosh (1973)
 Nanha Shikari (1973)
 Haathi Ke Daant (1973)
 Gaddar (1973) - Professor
 Ek Nari Do Roop (1973) - Dinesh
 Black Mail (1973) - Mr. Mehta
 Anamika (1973) - Dr. Irshad Husain
 Achanak (1973) - Colonel Bakshi
 Dak Bangla (1974)
 Chor Chor (1974)
 Patthar Aur Payal (1974) - DIG B.K. Varma
 Call Girl (1974) - Sonachand
 Benaam (1974) - Police Commissioner (as Iftekhar)
 Majboor (1974) - Police Inspector Khurana
 Zehreela Insaan (1974) - Principal Vishamber Nath
 Jeevan Sangram (1974) - Police Inspector
 Woh Main Nahin (1974) - Prosecution Lawyer
 Ujala Hi Ujala (1974) - Mr. Jamuna Prasad
 Raja Shiv Chhatrapati (1974)
 Raja Kaka (1974)
 Pran Jaye Par Vachan Na Jaye (1974) - Seth Dhanraj
 Jeevan Sangram (1974) - Police Inspector
 Ishq Ishq Ishq (1974) - Ghumli
 Badla (1974) - DSP Lobo
 Azad Mohabbat (1974)
 36 Ghante (1974) - Vijay's Father
 Phanda (1975)
 Deewaar (1975) - Mulk Raj Daavar
 Ek Hans Ka Jora (1975) - Tina's Father
 Dharmatma (1975) - Vikram Singh
 Chori Mera Kaam (1975) - Police Commissioner (as Iftikar)
 Zakhmee (1975) - Judge Ashok Ganguly
 Sholay (1975) - Narmalaji (Radha's Father)
 Saazish (1975) - Interpol Officer Mohanlal Saxena
 Mazaaq (1975) - Moushumi's Father
 Khel Khel Mein (1975) - Inspector Bhupendra Singh / Black Cobra
 Jaan Hazir Hai (1975)
 Badnaam (1975)
 Aakhri Daao (1975) - Inspector Khurana
 Kabhi Kabhie (1976) - Mr. Malhotra (uncredited)
 Jaaneman (1976) - Police Commissioner
 Fakira (1976) - Commissioner Sujit (Neeta's Father)
 Ek Se Badhkar Ek (1976) - Police Commissioner (uncredited)
 Laila Majnu (1976) - Emir Sharwari
 Zindagi (1976) - Verma
 Gumrah (1976) - Professor Gupta
Phir Janam Lenge Hum (1977)
 Do Dilwale (1977)
 Dangal (1977)
 Karm (1977) - Judge Shyamlal Kumar
 Abhi To Jee Lein (1977) - Deepak's Father
 Videsh (1977) - CBI Inspector Prasad Sinha
 Paapi (1977) - Inspector (Raj Kumar's Foster Father)
 Kali Raat (1977)
 Janam Janam Na Saath (1977)
 Dulhan Wahi Jo Piya Man Bhaye (1977) - Dr. Farid
 Chandi Sona (1977) - Police Commissioner
 Apnapan (1977) - Kishan Agarwal
 Agent Vinod (1977) - Madanlal
 Vishwanath (1978) - Police Commissioner Mahanta
 Ganga Ki Saugandh (1978) - Gupta
 Phaansi (1978) - Retired Sub-Inspector Mahendra Pratap Singh
 Bandie (1978) - Senapati Raghuvir Singh
 Ankhiyon Ke Jharokhon Se (1978) - Dr. Pradhan
 Besharam (1978) - Police Commissioner
 Trishul (1978) - Mr. P.L. Varma
 Don (1978) - DSP D'Silva (as Iftekhar)
 Tere Pyaar Mein (1978) 
 Khoon Ki Pukaar (1978) - Khan
 Khoon Ka Badla Khoon (1978) - Commissioner Kotwal
 Khatta Meetha (1978) - Mr. Cooper (Lawyer)
 Shikshaa (1979) - Rai Bahadur Dwarka Das Gupta
 Do Ladke Dono Kadke (1979) - Inspector Shinde
 Jhoota Kahin Ka (1979) - Police Inspector
 The Great Gambler (1979) - Deepchand
 Noorie (1979) - Ghulam Nabi
 Mr. Natwarlal (1979)
 Surakshaa (1979) - CBI Head (as Iftakar)
 Kaala Patthar (1979) - Col. Harpal Singh
 Shaayad (1979) - Public Prosecutor
 Love in Canada (1979) - Mr.Do Shatru Khanna
 Cobra (1980)
 Zalim (1980) - Inspector Kamat
 The Burning Train (1980) - Railway Board Chair Jagmohan
 Jyoti Bane Jwala (1980)
 Karz (1980) - Dr. Daniel
 Dostana (1980) - Prosecuting Lawyer
 Humkadam (1980) - Dr. Farid
 Insaf Ka Tarazu (1980) - The Judge
 Sanjh Ki Bela (1980)
 Maan Abhiman (1980) - Thakur Sumer Singh
 Ganga Aur Suraj (1980)
 Do Shatru (1980) - Karan sing
 Bombay 405 Miles (1980) - Ranvir Singh
 Naari (1981) - Hakeem Noor Ali
 Krodhi (1981) - Commissioner of Police
 Chehre Pe Chehra (1981) - Colonel (Diana's Father)
 Agni Pareeksha (1981) - Psychiatrist Dr. Sen
 Khoon Aur Paani (1981) - DSP Khan
 Wardaat (1981) - Chief
 Rocky (1981) - Dr. Bhagwandas
 Harjaee (1981) - Dr. Gupta
 Sannata (1981)
 Baseraa (1981) - Dr. B.K. Gokhale
 Ghungroo Ki Awaaz (1981) - Dr. Dixit
 Raksha (1981) - Head of the Secret Service
 Raaz (1981) - Mr. Sharma
 Laparwah (1981) - Inspector
 Saath Saath (1982) - Mr. Gupta
 Yeh Vaada Raha (1982) - Dr. Sahni
 Rajput (1982) - Ram Avtaar Singh
 Sun Sajna (1982) - Karim
 Nikaah (1982) - Jumman Chacha
 Bezubaan (1982) - Amarnath (Kalpana's Father)
 Dulha Bikta Hai (1982) - Seth Daulatrai walia
 Dil Hi Dil Mein (1982) - Mr. Sahni
 Dard Ka Rishta (1982) - Head - Tata hospital
 Apradhi Kaun ? (1982) - Mr. Khanna (Public Prosecutor)
 Mangal Pandey (1983) - Police Superintendent R.P. Gupta (uncredited)
 Ganga Meri Maa (1983)
 Rachana (1983) - Doctor
 Sun Meri Laila (1983) - Abid Khan
 Mahaan (1983) - Police Commissioner (uncredited)
 Jaane Jaan (1983) - Mr. Kapoor
 Sadma (1983) - Train Passenger
 Mazdoor (1983) - Kundanlal Batra
 Qayamat (1983) - Retired Judge Sinha
 Mawaali (1983) - Public Prosecutor
 Rishta Kagaz Ka (1983) - Bhatnagar
 Main Awara Hoon (1983) - Dr. Rashid
 Haadsa (1983) - Police Inspector
 Dharti Aakash (1983, TV Movie) - Saddanand Chowdhury
 Prarthana (1984)
 The Far Pavilions (1984, TV Mini-Series) - Nakshaband Khan (as Iftekhar)
 Inquilaab (1984) - Bombay Police Commissioner
 Mashaal (1984) - Doctor
 Boxer (1984) - Rushie
Hanste Khelte (1984)-Lawyer Shanti Prasad Goel
 Maqsad (1984) - Doctor
 Ram Tera Desh (1984) - Police Commissioner
 Dharm Aur Qanoon (1984) - Dr. John
 Phulwari (1984) - Chowdhury
 Aaj Ki Awaaz (1984) - Judge V.V. Deshmukh
 Jagir (1984) - I.G. Praveen Singh
 Awaaz (1984) - Police Commissioner
 Yeh Ishq Nahin Aasaan (1984) - Akhtar Mirza
 Yaadon Ki Zanjeer (1984) - CBI Officer
 Mujhe Shakti Do (1984) - Jyoti's father - police commissioner
 Kanoon Kya Karega (1984) - Police Commissioner Samant
 Grahasthi (1984) - Karim
 Aaj Ka Daur (1985) - Wealthy Man
 Kabhi Ajnabi The (1985) - Pappa
 Tawaif (1985) - Lala Fakirchand
 Hum Dono (1985) - Seth. Mathura Das
 Yudh (1985) - Commissioner
 Misaal (1985) - Nath Saab
 Meri Jung (1985) - Garewal Saab
 Ek Daku Saher Mein (1985) - Jailor Shaukat Hussain (as Iftikhar)
 Jaanoo (1985) - Dr. Prabha's Senior
 Dekha Pyar Tumhara (1985) - Target's Managing Partner
 Awara Baap (1985) - Bihari
 Yaar Kasam (1985)
 Salma (1985) - Ustadji (as Iftikhar)
 Phaansi Ke Baad (1985) - Mohamed Riyaz
 Maujaan Dubai Diyaan (1985) - Roshanlal
 Bond 303 (1985) - Commissioner of Police
 Aakhri Chaal (1985, TV Movie)
 Khamosh Nigahen (1986)
 Locket (1986)
 Tan-Badan (1986) - Diwan Devendra Pratap (uncredited)
 Bhagwaan Dada (1986) - Doctor
 Peechha Karro (1986) - Commissioner
 Zindagani (1986) - Mr. Thakur – Sumitra Devi's Father (as Iftekhar)
 Angaaray (1986) - Khan Chacha (as Iftekhar)
 Insaniyat Ke Dushman (1987) - Senior Police Officer
 Nazrana (1987) - Advocate
 Itihaas (1987) - Senior Police Officer (as Iftekhar)
 Awam (1987) - Ram Kumar
 Himmat Aur Mehanat (1987) - Doctor
 Marte Dam Tak (1987) - D.C.P. Lal
 Razia (1988)
 Nagin Ke Do Dushman (1988)
 Tamacha (1988) - Senior Officer (as Iftekhar)
 Falak (1988 film) - Mr. D'Souza
 Commando (1988) - Restaurant Manager (uncredited)
 Paap Ko Jalaa Kar Raakh Kar Doonga (1988) - Inspector General of Police (as Iftekhar)
 Woh Phir Aayegi (1988) - Raju's Dad
 Main Tere Liye (1988) - Advocate Mehta
 Dharam Shatru (1988)
 Saaya (1989)
 Guru (1989) - Dead in photograph (uncredited)
 Farz Ki Jung (1989) - Mr. Walia
 Na-Insaafi (1989) - Khanna (Ravi's dad)
 Nocturne Indien (1989) - Le professeur de théosophie
 Shiva (1989) - Principal (as Iftekhar)
 Galiyon Ka Badshah (1989) - Police Commissioner
 Akanksha (1989, TV Movie) - Employer (as Iftekhar)
 Vidrohi (1990)
 Karishma Kismat Ka (1990)
 Maha-Sangram (1990) - Rahim
 Kanoon Ki Zanjeer (1990) - Jailor
 Kaaranama (1990) -Suraj's Father
 Jaan-E-Wafa (1990)
 Iraada (1991) - Ali
 Lakhpati (1991)
 Hayratt (1992)
 City of Joy (1992) - Hasari's Father
 Khule-Aam (1992) - Col. Pratap Singh Rana (as Iftikhar)
 Bekhudi (1992) - (as Iftekhar Khan)
 Kala Coat (1993) - Professor Khurana
 Yaar Meri Zindagi (2008) - Munim

References

External links
 

Male actors in Hindi cinema
Indian male film actors
1995 deaths
1920 births
20th-century Indian male actors